Robert Klauß (born 1 December 1984) is a German football manager and former player, who last managed 1. FC Nürnberg.

Managerial statistics

References

External links

RB Leipzig players
SSV Markranstädt players
RB Leipzig II players
RB Leipzig non-playing staff
1. FC Nürnberg managers
1984 births
Living people
People from Eberswalde
German footballers
German football managers
Association football forwards
2. Bundesliga managers
Footballers from Brandenburg